Andrés Tan Franco (30 November 1925 – 9 February 2008) was a Filipino former high jumper who competed in the 1952 Summer Olympics.

Early life
Franco was born on 30 November 1925 in Tondo, Manila to Sabina Tan and Agaton Franco. He is the youngest among 6 siblings. He had four sisters and one older brother. Franco is of Spanish and Chinese descent.

Sporting career
The highlight of Franco's career was his participation at the 1951 Asian Games in the high jump event finishing 1.93m. He won a bronze in the next edition in 1954. He participated at the 1952 Summer Olympics in the high jump event finishing 31st. Franco stood six foot tall.

Franco later played basketball, then he became a basketball referee upon his retirement as a basketball player.

Later life
Franco then started his career as a police officer. He also became a technical official in track and field.

During the early years of the Philippine Amateur Basketball League approached one sports writer at the Rizal Memorial Coliseum complaining that the PABL officials at the gate of the sports venue wouldn't let him watch the then ongoing game where his son Aris was playing. The journalist approached PABL chairman, Oscar Villadolid who recognized Franco. Villadolid introduced Franco to the stuff then stated that from then on Franco will be allowed to watch any game he pleases and a seat at the presidential box was to be reserved for him. Franco then watched numerous games at the Coliseum.

Sometime in his later years, Franco suffered a stroke. He died in early 2008 due to a lingering illness.

Honors
Athlete of the Decade (1945-1954) by the National Collegiate Athletic Association.

References

1925 births
2008 deaths
Filipino male high jumpers
Filipino people of Spanish descent
Filipino people of Chinese descent
Olympic track and field athletes of the Philippines
Athletes (track and field) at the 1952 Summer Olympics
Asian Games medalists in athletics (track and field)
Athletes (track and field) at the 1951 Asian Games
Athletes (track and field) at the 1954 Asian Games
Asian Games gold medalists for the Philippines
Asian Games bronze medalists for the Philippines
Medalists at the 1951 Asian Games
Medalists at the 1954 Asian Games
People from Tondo, Manila
Sportspeople from Manila
20th-century Filipino people